Alex Hammond, also known as Alex Quinn, (born 1974) is a British television presenter, reporter working for Sky Sports Racing. Hammond was also a columnist for Sporting Life, while it operated.

Media career
Hammond started her broadcasting career on The Racing Channel in 1998, before joining Sky Sports News in 2003. Hammond presented features on Sky Sports News' "Good Morning Sports Fans" schedule, from 6.00am to 10.00am, where she provided extended coverage of recent horse racing events, as well as a Tip of the Day.

She covered the role of a track reporter for the At the Races channel.  She has also presented Sky Sports' coverage of the Horse of the Year Show.

Hammond has been the lead presenter on Sky Sports Racing since the channel's launch on 1 January 2019, after over 15 years presenting on Sky Sports News.

Amateur horse racing career
Hammond has taken part in over 50 amateur flat races, including the 2013 St Patrick's Day Derby where she rode Mica Mika.

References

External links
Profile - Alex Hammond Sky Sports News
Alex Hammond at TV Newsroom

Living people
1974 births
English television presenters
Sky Sports presenters and reporters